Lunchables is a brand of food and snacks manufactured by Kraft Heinz in Chicago, Illinois and marketed under the Oscar Mayer brand. They were initially introduced in Seattle in 1988 before being released nationally in 1989. Many Lunchables products are produced in a Garland, Texas facility, and are then distributed across the United States.

In the United Kingdom and Ireland, the product is sold as "Dairylea Lunchables" under the Dairylea brand, originally by Kraft Foods Inc., and currently by its successor Mondelez.

History
Tom Bailey created the concept and product known as Lunchables. Lunchables was designed in 1985 by Bob Drane, Tom Bailey, Jeff James, and Deborah Giarusso as a way for Oscar Mayer to sell more bologna and other lunch meat. After organizing focus groups of American mothers Drane discovered that their primary concern was time. Working mothers especially were pressed by the time constraints of fixing breakfast for their families as well as packing a lunch for their children to eat at school. This gave Drane the idea of creating a convenient prepackaged lunch featuring Oscar Mayer's trademark lunch meats. Crackers were substituted for bread because they would last longer in grocery coolers. The cheese was provided by Kraft when Oscar Mayer merged with Kraft in 1988. The design of the package was based on the look of an American TV dinner.

The term 'Lunchables' emerged from a list of possible names for the prepackaged meal that included, among others: On-Trays, Crackerwiches, Mini Meals, Lunch Kits, Snackables, Square Meals, Walk Meals, Go-Packs, and Fun Mealz.

Lunchables combinations
Lunchables offers 30 different kinds of meal variety combinations, which include crackers, pizzas, chicken nuggets, small hot dogs, small burgers, nachos, subs, and wraps. A typical package, such as the crackers meal combination, contains an equal number of crackers and small slices of meat and cheese. The brand also created two versions targeting adults, by increasing the amount of food offered in each package, but these have since been discontinued. The first was called the "Deluxe" and contained two types of meats and cheeses as well as a mustard condiment and a mint. The second version, called "Maxed Out" (originally "Mega Packs"), was available with 40% more food than a regular Lunchables.

Lunchables also carries an assortment of drinks and desserts. In certain meal combinations, Capri Sun juice drinks are offered, either in a traditional flavor or of the "Roarin’ Waters" variant. Other drinks included are bottled water and a generic unlabeled small can of cola; however, the latter was later replaced with Capri Sun drinks due to health concerns. As for dessert, some packages contain Jell-O gelatin or pudding or a candy alternative, such as Butterfingers or Reese's cups. 

As of 2022, the varieties of Lunchables available in the UK are more limited in comparison to the 1990s and 2000s. The burger, pizza, hot dog and sub varieties are no longer sold, and the product is mostly limited to crackers, cheese and ham. Many varieties including turkey, ham, sausage, hot dog and pizza still are sold in Canada.

Concern about health effects
A line of the trays called Maxed Out was eventually released that had as many as nine grams of saturated fat, or nearly an entire day's recommended maximum for children, with up to two-thirds of the maximum for sodium and 65 grams (13 tsp) of sugar. Regarding the shift toward more salt, sugar, and fat in meals for kids, Geoffrey Bible, former C.E.O. of Philip Morris USA (prior owner of Kraft Foods), remarked that he read an article that said: "If you take Lunchables apart, the most healthy item in it is the napkin."

In 1997, Lunchables came under fire for having high saturated fat and sodium content while being marketed as a healthy children's meal. For example, a single serving of Ham and Swiss Lunchables contained 1,780 milligrams of sodium, which is 47 percent of the recommended daily allowance for an adult.

Due to the growing concern of childhood obesity, UK Lunchables opted to create healthier options for children by eliminating Capri Sun drinks and mini Daim bars, and replacing the sugary drink and candy with orange juice and strawberry yogurt in 2004. The brand also began offering lower calorie candy alternatives, rather than including the standard Reese's cup in the package. Capri Sun and candy are still available as options in the U.S. Lunchables.

As of 2007, eight varieties of Lunchables are considered Sensible Solution products; the brand has since excluded the exceptionally unhealthy items, replacing Reese's Peanut Butter Cups, Cola, Nestle Crunch bars, M&M's, and Kool-Aid Jammers with lower calorie and sugar options, such as Airheads, fruit cups, and Tropical Punch flavored Kool-Aid mix.

See also

 Meal, Ready-to-Eat
 Cheese and crackers
 List of brand name snack foods

References

External links

Products introduced in 1988
Kraft Foods brands
Brand name snack foods
Food for children